Karl Seglem (born 8 July 1961 in Årdalstangen, Norway) is a Norwegian Jazz musician (saxophone and bukkehorn), composer and producer, known from a series of combined jazz and traditional music releases, as well as leading his own record label NorCD from 1991.

Career 

Seglem was educated on the Music program at Voss Folk High School (1978–80), followed by cooperation with Arvid Genius, «Jan Grieg Qvartet», Kenneth Sivertsen (1980–92) and Knut Kristiansen (during the 1980s) in Bergen. He also led his own Jazz band «Growl», wrote for the magazin «Jazznytt» and was politically active in Foreningen norske jazzmusikere.

He has released eight albums in his own name, and has a long lasting cooperation with Terje Isungset like in the bands Isglem and trio «Utla» where also fiddle player Håkon Høgemo contributed, resulting in many record releases. begge har resultert i flere utgivelser on his own label. He has also released two albums cooperating with the poet Jon Fosse.

Around 2000 he started experimenting with the old Norwegian instrument bukkehorn or Billy Goat Horn. He is currently the main instrumentalist playing the instrument in the world.

Seglem has toured extensively with Rikskonsertene and Den norske jazzscene. In 2013 he also toured in Norway with Morning Has Occurred fronted by Natalie Sandtorv and Marte Eberson, for the project 'Jazz til ungdom' (Jazz to the youth).

At Vossajazz 2014, he joined Gisle Torvik presenting his "fjord-jazz" together with Andreas Ulvo and Epletrio, including Sigurd Hole and Jonas Howden Sjøvaag.

Honors 
1983: Årdal Kommune´s Culture Prize
1998: Gammleng-prisen in open class
1998: Edvard Prize in the class Popular music, major work, together with Reidar Skår for TYA
2010: Buddyprisen
2012: Commissioned work Som spor at Vossajazz

Discography 
1988: Poems for Trio (Hot Club Records; with Kåre Thomsen and Ole Amund Gjersvik)
1991: Sogn-A-Song (NorCD)
1994: Rit (NorCD)
1998: Spir (album) (NorCD)
2002: Nye nord (NorCD)
2004: New north (NorCD)
2004: Femstein (NorCD)
2005: Budda og reven Singie (NorCD)
2005: Reik (NorCD)
2006: Urbs (NorCD)
2008: Spelferd – a playful journey DVD (NorCD)
2009: NORSKjazz.no (NorCD)
2009: Skoddeheimen (NorCD)
2009: Draumkvedet (NorCD)
2010: Ossicles (NorCD)
2013: NyeSongar.no (Ozella Music)
2014: Som Spor (NorCD)
2015: Lærad The Tree (NorCD)
2015: Live In Germany (NorCD)
2015: WorldJazz (NorCD)
2016: Nordic Balm (NorCD)

References

External links

Karl Seglem NorCD.no
Karl Seglem Biography - Norsk Musikkinformasjon
Monitor: Morning Has Occurred og Karl Seglem

1961 births
Living people
Norwegian jazz saxophonists
Norwegian jazz composers
20th-century Norwegian musicians
21st-century Norwegian musicians
Musicians from Årdal
Hot Club Records artists
NorCD artists
21st-century saxophonists